Varin may refer to:

People 
 Jean Varin (1604–1672), a French sculptor and engraver
 Quentin Varin (circa 1570–1634), French painter
 Robert A. Varin, Polish-Canadian materials scientist and mechanical engineer

Places

Cambodia
 Varin District, a district of Siem Reap Province, Cambodia

France
 Battenans-Varin is a commune located in the Department of Doubs

Iran
 Varin-e Bala, a village in Markazi Province, Iran
 Varin-e Pain, a village in Markazi Province, Iran

Slovakia
 Varín, a village and municipality in Žilina District, Slovakia